Chal-e Siyah Gelal (also Romanized as Chāl-e Sīyāh Gelāl; also known as Chāl-e Sīyāh) is a village in Chin Rural District, Ludab District, Boyer-Ahmad County, Kohgiluyeh and Boyer-Ahmad Province, Iran. At the 2006 census, its population was 15, in 4 families.

References 

Populated places in Boyer-Ahmad County